Colfax High School is a public school serving grades 9 through 12 in Colfax, Dunn County, Wisconsin, United States.

Notable alumni
Stuart E. Barstad, United States Air Force chaplain
Selmer W. Gunderson, Wisconsin State Representative

References

Public high schools in Wisconsin
Schools in Dunn County, Wisconsin